Anna Björnsdóttir (born 4 July 1954), also known as Anna Bjorn, is an Icelandic graphic designer, yoga instructor, documentary filmmaker, model and actress. In 1974 she represented Iceland in Miss Universe in Manila and was voted Miss Congenial by her fellow contestants.

Career
In the 1970s and 1980s Anna had a successful modeling career, being represented by the Ford Modeling Agency in New York and Nina Blanchard in Los Angeles. She was featured in a great number of television commercials both in Europe and the United States and held exclusive contracts with Noxema and Vidal Sassoon. During that time she studied acting in Los Angeles and appeared in several films and television shows in the United States, such as More American Graffiti and The Sword and the Sorcerer and Get Crazy.

In 1982 Anna co-produced, filmed and edited the documentary From Iceland to Brazil, about Icelandic immigrants to Brazil in the 1870s, and in 1987 she produced and directed the documentary Love & War, about the "war brides" of Iceland.

She became a certified yoga instructor in 1994, having practiced yoga since the late 1970s. She opened her own yoga studio, Yogastöð Vesturbæjar/Yoga West, in Reykjavík, Iceland, in 1994 and sold the company in 2007.

In 2003, Anna graduated from the Iceland Academy of the Arts with a BA degree in graphic design. Since then she has worked as a freelance graphic designer, focusing on logo and book design.

Personal life
Anna was married to musician Jakob Frímann Magnússon.

She divides her time between Europe and the United States. Her partner since 1994 is advertising CEO Halldór Guðmundsson.

In 2011, The Boston Globe  claimed that she gave the FBI information that led to gangster and fugitive Whitey Bulger's capture.

References

Filmography

Film

Television

External links 
 

1954 births
20th-century Icelandic actresses
Icelandic graphic designers
Women graphic designers
Icelandic expatriates in the United States
Icelandic female models
Icelandic film actresses
Icelandic television actresses
Living people
Miss Universe 1974 contestants
Place of birth missing (living people)